Huntington Township is one of the sixteen townships of Ross County, Ohio, United States.  The 2000 census found 6,018 people in the township.

Geography
Located in the southern part of the county, it borders the following townships:
Scioto Township - north
Franklin Township - east
Pee Pee Township, Pike County - southeast
Pebble Township, Pike County - south
Twin Township - west

No municipalities are located in Huntington Township, although two unincorporated communities are located there: Denver in the south, and Knockemstiff in the northeast.

Name and history
Statewide, other Huntington Townships are located in Brown, Gallia, and Lorain counties.

Government
The township is governed by a three-member board of trustees, who are elected in November of odd-numbered years to a four-year term beginning on the following January 1. Two are elected in the year after the presidential election and one is elected in the year before it. There is also an elected township fiscal officer, who serves a four-year term beginning on April 1 of the year after the election, which is held in November of the year before the presidential election. Vacancies in the fiscal officership or on the board of trustees are filled by the remaining trustees.

Education
Huntington High School is a central feature of Huntington Township.  A well-maintained athletics facility is available for public use.

Notable people
 Madison Hemings, son of Thomas Jefferson, a carpenter and farmer

References

External links
County website

Townships in Ross County, Ohio
Townships in Ohio